Lord Cecil may refer to:

 Baron Cecil, a subsidiary title of the Marquess of Salisbury
 Lord David Cecil (1902–1986), English aristocrat, literary scholar, biographer and academic
 Lord Eustace Cecil (1834–1921), British Conservative Party politician
 Lord Richard Cecil (1948–1978), Old Etonian
 Lord Robert Cecil (1864–1958), British lawyer, politician and diplomat, and winner of the 1937 Nobel Peace Prize
 Lord William Cecil (courtier) (1854–1943), British royal courtier
 Lord William Cecil (bishop) (1863–1936), Bishop of Exeter, 1916–1936
 William Cecil, 1st Baron Burghley or Lord Burghley (1520–1598), English statesman, the chief advisor of Queen Elizabeth I

See also
 Lord Gascoyne-Cecil (disambiguation)